Nordic combined at the 1948 Winter Olympics consisted of one event, held from 31 January to 1 February. The ski jumping portion took place at Olympiaschanze St. Moritz, while the cross-country portion took place around the hills of St. Moritz.

Medal summary

Medal table

Norway, which had won every previous Olympic medal in Nordic combined, were stunned to see Finland and Sweden split the three medals in St. Moritz.

Events

Individual
The 18 kilometre cross-country race was used to determine the cross-country scores for the nordic combined, which did not have a separate ski race. 39 competitors in that race went on to compete in the ski jumping, with each jumper taking three attempts, and the top two counting for points. The athlete with the highest combined points score was awarded the gold medal.

Participating NOCs
Thirteen nations participated in nordic combined at the St. Moritz Games. Bulgaria and France made their Olympic nordic combined debuts.

References

External links
 Sports-Reference - 1948 Olympics - Nordic Combined - Individual

 
1948 Winter Olympics events
1948
1948 in Nordic combined
Nordic combined competitions in Switzerland
Men's events at the 1948 Winter Olympics